In enzymology, an anthranilate N-methyltransferase is an enzyme that catalyzes the chemical reaction

S-adenosyl-L-methionine + anthranilate  S-adenosyl-L-homocysteine + N-methylanthranilate

Thus, the two substrates of this enzyme are S-adenosyl methionine and anthranilate, whereas its two products are S-adenosylhomocysteine and N-methylanthranilate.

This enzyme belongs to the family of transferases, specifically those transferring one-carbon group methyltransferases.  The systematic name of this enzyme class is S-adenosyl-L-methionine:anthranilate N-methyltransferase. This enzyme is also called anthranilic acid N-methyltransferase.  This enzyme participates in acridone alkaloid biosynthesis.

References

 

EC 2.1.1
Enzymes of unknown structure
Anthranilates